Łuszczów Drugi  is a village in the administrative district of Gmina Wólka, within Lublin County, Lublin Voivodeship, in eastern Poland.

See also
 Łuszczów Pierwszy
 Łuszczów-Kolonia

References

Villages in Lublin County